Ngizim (also known as Ngizmawa, Ngezzim, Ngódṣin) is a Chadic language spoken by the Ngizim people in Yobe State, Nigeria.

Writing System 

The digraphs dl, sh, tl, zh are also used.

Notes

Further reading
 Mohammed Alhaji Adamu, Usman Babayo Garba Potiskum, 2009, Ngizim–English–Hausa Dictionary, Yobe Language Research Project.
 Russell G. Schuh.  1972.  "Aspects of Ngizim Syntax," University of California, Los Angeles PhD dissertation.
 Russell G. Schuh.  1977.  "Bade/Ngizim determiner system," Afroasiatic Linguistics 4:1-74.
 Russell G. Schuh.  1981.  A Dictionary of Ngizim.  University of California Publications in Linguistics 99.  Berkeley:  University of California Press.

External links
 English-Ngizim Wordlist
 Descriptive papers on Ngizim from UCLA

West Chadic languages
Languages of Nigeria